Don't Stop is the twenty-second studio album by English rock band Status Quo. The album of cover versions includes guest appearances from Tessa Niles on tracks 6 and 14, The Beach Boys on track 1, Brian May of Queen on track 7 and Maddy Prior of Steeleye Span on track 15.

"Fun, Fun, Fun", "When You Walk In The Room", "Don't Stop" and "All Around My Hat" were all released as singles, although only the first of these reached the British Top 30. However the album entered the chart at No 2 in the first week of a three-month stay, making it their best performing album of the decade apart from their 1990 compilation Rocking All Over The Years.

Track listing
 "Fun, Fun, Fun" (Brian Wilson, Mike Love) – with The Beach Boys – 4:03
 "When You Walk in the Room" (Jackie DeShannon) – 4:05
 "I Can Hear the Grass Grow" (Roy Wood) – 3:27
 "You Never Can Tell" (Chuck Berry) – 3:50
 "Get Back" (John Lennon, Paul McCartney) – 3:23
 "The Safety Dance" (Ivan Doroschuk) – 3:56 – with Tessa Niles
 "Raining in My Heart" (Felice Bryant, Boudleaux Bryant) – with Brian May – 3:32
 "Don't Stop" (Christine McVie) – 3:40
 "Sorrow" (Bob Feldman, Jerry Goldstein, Gottehrer) – 4:14
 "Proud Mary" (John Fogerty) – 3:30
 "Lucille" (Al Collins, Little Richard) – 2:58
 "Johnny and Mary" (Robert Palmer) – 3:35
 "Get Out Of Denver" (Bob Seger) – 4:09
 "The Future's So Bright (I Gotta Wear Shades)"  (Pat MacDonald) – 3:36 – with Tessa Niles
 "All Around My Hat" (traditional, arrangement by Francis Rossi, Rick Parfitt, Andrew Bown, John 'Rhino' Edwards, Jeff Rich) – with Maddy Prior – 3:56

2006 reissue bonus tracks

 "Tilting At The Mill" (Bown, Rossi, Parfitt, Edwards, Rich)
 "Mortified" (Bown, Rossi, Parfitt, Edwards, Rich)
 "Temporary Friend" (Bown, Rossi, Parfitt, Edwards, Rich)
 "I'll Never Get Over You" (Mills)

Personnel
Status Quo
Francis Rossi – vocals, lead guitar
Rick Parfitt – vocals, guitar
Andy Bown – keyboards
John Edwards – bass, backing vocals
Jeff Rich – drums, percussion

Additional musicians

Gary Barnacle – saxophone on "Fun, Fun, Fun", "Get Back", "Sorrow", "Proud Mary" and "Get Out Of Denver"
John Thirkell – trumpet on "Fun, Fun, Fun", "Get Back", "Sorrow", "Proud Mary" and "Get Out Of Denver"
Geraint Watkins – accordion on "You Never Can Tell" and "Safety Dance"
Troy Donockley – Uilleann Pipes, whistles on "All Around My Hat"
Pip Williams – brass arrangements on "Get Back", "Proud Mary" and "Get Out Of Denver"

Charts

Certifications

References

1996 albums
Status Quo (band) albums
Covers albums